Freddy González Fonten (born July 10, 1977 in Cumaná, Sucre State) is a male long-distance runner from Venezuela.

Biography
He represented his native country at the 2004 Summer Olympics in Athens, Greece. He set his personal best in the men's 5,000 metres (13:22.30) on July 3, 2004 in San Sebastián.

Achievements

References

External links

1977 births
Living people
Venezuelan male middle-distance runners
Venezuelan male long-distance runners
Athletes (track and field) at the 2004 Summer Olympics
Athletes (track and field) at the 1999 Pan American Games
Athletes (track and field) at the 2003 Pan American Games
Athletes (track and field) at the 2007 Pan American Games
Olympic athletes of Venezuela
Central American and Caribbean Games silver medalists for Venezuela
Competitors at the 1998 Central American and Caribbean Games
Competitors at the 2002 Central American and Caribbean Games
Competitors at the 2006 Central American and Caribbean Games
Central American and Caribbean Games medalists in athletics
Pan American Games competitors for Venezuela
People from Cumaná
20th-century Venezuelan people
21st-century Venezuelan people